Elm Hill Archaeological Site is a historic archaeological site located on the north bank of the Roanoke River near Castle Heights, Mecklenburg County, Virginia. It is a large, Late Woodland period palisaded village site with evidence of occupation reaching back to the Late Archaic Period.  The district is included within the Tobacco Heritage Trail.

It was listed on the National Register of Historic Places in 1985.

References

Archaeological sites on the National Register of Historic Places in Virginia
National Register of Historic Places in Mecklenburg County, Virginia